Altes Schloss or Altes Schloß (German, 'Old Palace' or 'Old Castle') is the name of several structures:

Germany
 Altes Schloss (Affalterthal), Egloffstein, county of Forchheim, Bavaria
 Altes Schloss (Bad Berneck), Bad Berneck, county of Heilbronn, Bavaria
 Altes Schloss, Bad Bocklet, Bad Bocklet Bavaria
 Bosselstein Castle (Altes Schloss), Idar-Oberstein, county of Birkenfeld, Rhineland-Palatinate
 Altes Schloss (Büdesheim), Büdesheim, Main-Kinzig-Kreis, Hesse
 Altes Schloß (Dermbach), Dermbach, Wartburgkreis, Thuringia
 Altes Schloss (Dillingen), Dillingen, county of Saarlouis, Saarland
 Altes Schloss (Drügendorf), demolished Wallburg near Drügendorf (Eggolsheim), county of Forchheim, Bavaria
 Altes Schloss (Freyenstein), Freyenstein, county of Ostprignitz-Ruppin, Brandenburg
 Altes Schloss (Gaildorf), Gaildorf, county of Schwäbisch Hall, Baden-Württemberg
 Altes Schloss (Gammertingen), Gammertingen, county of Sigmaringen, Baden-Württemberg
 Altes Schloss (Gießen), Gießen, county of Gießen, Hesse
 Altes Schloss (Grevenbroich), Grevenbroich, Rhein-Kreis Neuss, North Rhine-Westphalia
 Altes Gronauer Schloss, Krofdorf-Gleiberg, county of Gießen, Hesse
 Altes Schloss (Hahn), Hahn, county of Saarlouis, Saarland
 Homboll Castle (Altes Schloss), Hilzingen, county of Konstanz, Baden-Württemberg
 Hohenbaden Palace (Altes Schloss), Baden-Baden, Baden-Württemberg
 Altes Schloss (Ingolstadt), Ingolstadt, Bavaria
 Jagsthausen Castle (Altes Schloss), Jagsthausen, county of Heilbronn, Baden-Württemberg
 Altes Schloss (Kißlegg), Kißlegg, county of Ravensburg, Baden-Württemberg
 Altes Schloss (Markvippach), Markvippach, county of Sömmerda, Thuringia
 Altes Schloss (Neckarbischofsheim), Neckarbischofsheim, Rhein-Neckar-Kreis, Baden-Württemberg
 Altes Schloss (Oberzaunsbach), Pretzfeld, county of Forchheim, Bavaria
 Altes Schloss (Pappenheim), Pappenheim, county of Weißenburg-Gunzenhausen, Bavaria
 Altes Schloss (Scheiden), Scheiden, county of Merzig-Wadern, Saarland
 Altes Schloss (Schleißheim), in the castle complex of Schleißheim in Oberschleißheim, county of Munich, Bavaria
 Altes Schloss (Schwarzenfeld), county of Schwandorf, Bavaria 
 Altes Schloss (Stuttgart), Stuttgart, Baden-Württemberg
 Altes Schloss (Tettnang), Tettnang, Bodenseekreis, Baden-Württemberg
 Altes Schloss (Valley), Valley, county of Miesbach, Bavaria
 Altes Schloss (Wallerstein), Wallerstein Bavaria

Other countries
 Altes Schloss (Laxenburg) (in the water castle of Laxenburg), Laxenburg, district of Mödling, Niederösterreich, Österreich
 Altes Schloss (Banská Štiavnica), Banská Štiavnica (Schemnitz), Banskobystrický kraj, Slovakia
 Altes Schloss (Bümpliz), Bern-Bümpliz, Berne canton, Switzerland
 Himlštejn Castle, Stráž nad Ohří (Warta an der Eger), Karlovarský kraj, the Czech Republic

See also
 Alte Burg (disambiguation)